Sogang Law School is one of the professional graduate schools of Sogang University, located in Seoul, South Korea. Founded in 2009, it is one of the founding law schools in South Korea and is one of the smaller schools with each class in the three-year J.D. program having approximately 40 students.

References

Website 
 Official Website

Sogang University
Law schools in South Korea
Educational institutions established in 2009
2009 establishments in South Korea